The Chicago and Canada Southern Railway was a planned extension of the Canada Southern Railway west from Grosse Ile, Michigan to Chicago, Illinois. The line was only built to Fayette, Ohio, and was later split between the Detroit, Toledo and Ironton Railway and Lake Shore and Michigan Southern Railway.

History

In 1873 the Canada Southern Railway reached Michigan from Buffalo, New York via a train ferry and the Canada Southern Bridge Company across Grosse Ile. To continue west to Chicago, the Chicago and Canada Southern Railway was chartered July 11, 1871. The line had only reached Fayette, Ohio (though grading was done further west) in September 1873 when the Panic of 1873 had its full effect and construction was halted. 
Building the road to Chicago was suspended for the winter of 1873–74. The next spring, the railroad's management hired General John S. "Jack" Casement, who had built part of the Union Pacific, as the railroad contractor for construction from Fayette to Chicago. However, the company's financial situation never did improve and Casement did no work on the track.   

Some time after the Canada Southern was reorganized, the Chicago and Canada Southern was sold on November 22, 1888, to the Detroit and Chicago Railroad, owned by the Lake Shore and Michigan Southern Railway.

The track between Grosvenor and Corbus, Michigan in the middle of the line, was abandoned in 1893. In 1897 it was abandoned from Corbus east to Dundee, and in March 1898 the line east of Dundee was sold to the Detroit and Lima Northern Railroad, which became part of the Detroit, Toledo and Ironton Railway. The remaining piece west of Grosvenor was operated as a branch of the Lake Shore and Michigan Southern's Old Road from the Grosvenor end.

West from Montpelier, Ohio to beyond North Liberty, Indiana, the unfinished C&CS alignment was later used by the Wabash Railroad, which completed its line between Montpelier and Gary, Indiana in 1893.

See also
Michigan Air-Line Railroad, another partially built western extension of the Canada Southern Railway

References

Railroad History Database
History of the Lake Shore and Michigan Southern Railway Company
DT&I - The Railroad That Went No Place

Defunct Michigan railroads
Defunct Ohio railroads
Defunct Indiana railroads
Defunct Illinois railroads
Companies affiliated with the Lake Shore and Michigan Southern Railway
Companies affiliated with the Michigan Central Railroad
Predecessors of the New York Central Railroad
Railway companies established in 1871
Railway companies disestablished in 1888